The British Gendarmerie was a British paramilitary police field force created by Colonial Secretary Winston Churchill in April 1922 to police Mandatory Palestine.

Concerned with the high cost of British Army units acting as police forces in Palestine, Churchill decided that an elite police force similar to the Royal Canadian Mounted Police or South African Constabulary would be created for Mandatory Palestine. The unit was intended more for riot control rather than crime solving.

The 43 officers and 700 other ranks force were mostly recruited from the recently disbanded Royal Irish Constabulary and its Auxiliary Division who had themselves been recruited from ex-officers of the Great War.  Many of its original formations had been intended to be horse mounted but these plans were dropped in an economy measure.

The force was disbanded in June 1926 with its duties taken over by the Transjordan Frontier Force.

See also
 Palestine Police Force
 Arab Legion
 United States Zone Constabulary (Similar body in some respects, based in the US occupation zone of Germany in the immediate post-World War II period.)

Notes

External links
Black and Tans in Palestine  http://www.jerusalemquarterly.org/ViewArticle.aspx?id=305
The Formation, Composition and Conduct of the British Section of the Palestine Gendarmerie http://journals.cambridge.org/action/displayAbstract?fromPage=online&aid=9059656&fileId=S0018246X13000253

History of the British Empire
Mandatory Palestine
Defunct law enforcement agencies of Mandatory Palestine
Auxiliary military units
Auxiliary police units
1922 establishments in Mandatory Palestine